Volunteer-per-order was a name for a rating for young boys in the Royal Navy for young gentlemen who were training to become officers. The rating was introduced by Samuel Pepys in 1676 and the recipient received £24 a year and a letter from the crown which virtually guaranteed him promotion after the spending two years at sea and passing the examination for lieutenant.  The letter instructed the admirals and captains that the bearer was to be shown "such kindness as you shall judge fit for a gentleman, both in accommodating him in your ship and in furthering his improvement".  

Volunteers-per-order took the place of a midshipman on board the ship, which originally was a post for an experienced seaman.  Because of their higher social class and the aforementioned letter, they were nicknamed King's Letter boys to distinguish them from rest of the crew.  Another method of entry into the Royal Navy was serving as a servant to one of the officers, and by 1732 the last volunteer-per-order entered the navy to be replaced by service as a servant, or attending the new Royal Naval Academy.

Famous King's Letter Boys

Admiral Rodney
Admiral Byng

Footnotes

Royal Navy
Naval ranks